Emmott is a surname. Notable people with the surname include:

Alfred Emmott, 1st Baron Emmott (1858–1926), British businessman and Liberal Party politician
Basil Emmott (1894–1976), prolific English cinematographer, active from the 1920s to the 1960s
Bill Emmott (born 1956), English journalist
Charles Emmott, Unionist Member of Parliament (MP) for Glasgow Springburn between 1931 and 1935
Charles Emmott (rugby) (1869–1927), rugby union footballer of the 1890s for England, and Bradford
Stephen Emmott (born 1960), British scientist
Tony Emmott, British bodybuilder who won the 1977 Mr. Universe (professional) competition

See also
Emmott Hall, country house in the village of Laneshawbridge, Colne, Lancashire
Emmott Robinson (1883–1969), Yorkshire cricketer from 1919 to 1931